Metro Manila Summer Film Festival is an upcoming film festival to be held annually in Metro Manila, Philippines. The event was to be a spin-off of the Metro Manila Film Festival which is officially held every December. Like its sister festival, it would exclude foreign films and only show shortlisted entries in digital theaters except IMAX and 4D theaters.

It was originally slated to take place in 2020, but the COVID-19 pandemic forced to halt the event as a result of closure of the theaters having to shut for over 20 months. It is announced in January 2023 the first edition would now be taking place in April 2023.

Background
The Metro Manila Summer Film Festival was intended to be as a "second run" of the annual Metro Manila Film Festival (MMFF). The summer festival was proposed to start after Black Saturday which usually falls in the summer season of the Philippines while the regular MMFF will continue to start every Christmas Day of the year. A summer iteration of the MMFF was adopted to encourage Filipino filmmakers to create more films. It would not be the first time the MMFF was held "twice a year". During the tenure of Mayors Antonio Villegas of Manila and Joseph Estrada of San Juan, the MMFF was held twice with the first run starting every June 24 or Manila Foundation Day and the second run on December 25.

The summer film festival was a proposal of Senator Bong Go who became a member of the MMFF Executive Committee in 2019. The MMFF Executive Committee adopted Go's proposal and announced the establishment of a summer festival. The first edition was set to be held from April 11 to 21, 2020 but was cancelled due to the ongoing coronavirus pandemic. It would be organized in partnership with the Cinema Exhibitors Association of the Philippines. In 2021, the film festival was not held at all due to the pandemic. It was not held again in 2022 due to scheduling conflicts with the 2022 Philippine general election.

Film selection
Films to be screened at the Metro Manila Summer Film Festival will include films that were submitted but not selected as one of the official entries of the regular MMFF of the previous year.

Festivals

Notes

References

 
Summer Film Festival
Film festivals in the Philippines
Festivals in Metro Manila
Film festivals established in 2020